Brian Shields (1951–1997) was a Liverpool-born English painter. He is best known for painting industrial scenes of northern Britain. He acquired the nickname "Braaq" in his school days — on account of his artistic talent he was nicknamed "Braque" after the French artist Georges Braque.

He held his first exhibition in 1974. In 1977 he was invited to hold four exhibitions in London and at this time was described by The Times as "one of the six most successful artists in England."

He died of a brain haemorrhage.

References

External links
 About Braaq		
 Prices for Braaq
 Yorkshire Post - Painting by 'Liverpool Lowry' up for auction

1951 births
1997 deaths
20th-century English painters
English male painters
Artists from Liverpool
20th-century English male artists